Llanuras del Gaspar is a district of the Sarapiquí canton, in the Heredia province of Costa Rica.

History 
Llanuras del Gaspar was created on 6 October 1999 by Decreto Ejecutivo 28137-G.

Location 

It is located in the northern region of the country and borders the district of Puerto Viejo to the south and west, with the province of Limón to the east and Nicaragua to the north.
Its head, the village of La Aldea, is located 40 km (18 minutes) NE of Puerto Viejo and 122 km (2 hours 59 minutes) to the NE of San José the capital of the nation.

Geography 

Llanuras del Gaspar has an area of  km² and an elevation of  metres. It is the smallest district of the canton by surface.

It presents a plain territory by dominated by the plains of Sarapiquí.

Demography 

The district has 1 160 inhabitants, making it the third-most populous of the canton.

Demographics 

For the 2011 census, Llanuras del Gaspar had a population of  inhabitants.

Settlements
The 9 centers of population of the district son:

La Aldea (head of the district)
Caño San Luis
Chimurria
Chirriposito
Delta Costa Rica
Gaspar
Lagunilla
La Lucha
Tigra (Fátima)

Economy 

As in its neighboring district of Cureña, agriculture (banana, pineapple, yucca and plantain) is the basis of the local economy.

La Aldea, its head, has education and health services, is the last thanks to the presence of an BTIHC (Basic Team for Integral Health Care) or EBAIS, for its acronym in Spanish.

Transportation

Road transportation 
The district is covered by the following road routes:
 National Route 507
 National Route 510
 National Route 817

References 

Districts of Heredia Province
Populated places in Heredia Province
Municipalidad de Sarapiquí